The brown teal (Anas chlorotis) is a species of dabbling duck of the genus Anas native to New Zealand. For many years it had been considered to be conspecific with the flightless Auckland and Campbell teals in Anas aucklandica; the name "brown teal" has also been largely applied to that entire taxon. Common in the early years of European colonisation, the "brown duck" (as it had been often referred to) was heavily harvested as a food source. Its numbers quickly fell, especially in the South Island, and in 1921 they became fully protected. Captive breeding and releasing into predator-controlled areas has seen good localised populations re-introduced around the country in recent years.

Description
There are no distinctive differences between a male, female and a juvenile brown teal during non-mating season. They all have a white ring around their eyes as well as a mottled brown color on their heads and throat. During breeding season the male will begin to change color, now having a green colored head, chestnut colored breast and a white stripe on each side of their body. They will sometimes also have a white clerical neck band. This does vary as some males do tend to be more colorful than others.

Taxonomy

Pateke is the progenitor of the flightless Auckland teal and Campbell teals but all are now recognised as separate species on account of their geographic isolation and their plumage, size and genetic distinctions. The insular A. aucklandica and A. nesiotis are recognised as good species, but are still sometimes referred to as being part of the "brown teal group". The use of the name 'pateke' is now common and is specific for this particular species.

Concerns have been raised about establishing genetically similar populations during re-introduction. The original captive pateke were sourced from Great Barrier Island, where only one haplotype was found in abundance, compared with eleven haplotypes found in the other remaining population at Mimiwhangata. The newly released flocks exclusively contain these birds of captive origin, and diversity is perhaps now not being fully represented in the National population.

The former population of Fiordland brown teal, which died out by 2013 has been replaced with captive-origin birds. Sequencing showed striking similarity to grey duck and mallard sequences, with which they group. It therefore seems extremely likely that the former Fiordland population of brown teal have at sometime in the past hybridised extensively with these invading species

Behaviour
The brown teal is largely nocturnal in habit by dabbling duck standards. This is an evolutionary response to natural diurnal predators such as the New Zealand falcon, Eyles' harrier, or skuas further south in their range. Brown teal have no defense against introduced cats, dogs, stoats & ferrets, which can kill adults & ducklings, or against rats which eat eggs.

Diet

It feeds by dabbling and upending, like its relatives. Its diet consists mainly of aquatic invertebrates like insects and their larvae, or crustaceans. It appears quite fond of mollusks. Small species such as pipi (Paphies australis) and large wedge shell (Macomona liliana) are eaten whole and crushed in the gizzard. For feeding on larger cockles such as Austrovenus stutchburyi (New Zealand cockle), at least some New Zealand teals have developed a peculiar technique, as of now undocumented in other birds, to force their rather soft bills between the cockle shells and tear out the flesh with a jackhammer-like pumping motion. At night brown teal will forage on land some distance from the streams used as a refuge during the day (Worthy 2002).

Breeding
Nest of dry grass near water or under shelter of large Carex, heavily lined with down. A clutch of four to eight creamy-brown eggs is laid. Incubation is done by only the female and takes 27–30 days. The male stays in his territory as a guard, aggressive to all other waterfowl.

Distribution & conservation
This species is endangered and occurs predominantly on offshore islands but also in predator-proof sanctuaries on the mainland such as Tawharanui Regional Park. Formerly, it was widespread on the New Zealand mainland, but it disappeared there due to introduced predators like cats, dogs and rats, which easily preyed on this unwary, weakly flying bird. According to the IUCN categorization as VU D1, fewer than 1000 adult birds remain. The species has recently been upgraded to endangered by Birdlife International (Birdlife 2007), and the change will be reflected in the next update of the IUCN red list.

References

 BirdLife International (2007) Species factsheet: Anas chlorotis. Downloaded from https://www.webcitation.org/5QE8rvIqH?url=http://www.birdlife.org/ on 5/9/2007 
 Moore, Suzanne J. & Battley, Phil F. (2003): Cockle-opening by a dabbling duck, the Brown Teal. Waterbirds 26(3): 331–334. DOI:10.1675/1524-4695(2003)026[0331:CBADDT]2.0.CO;2 PDF fulltext
 Worthy, T.H. & Holdaway, R.N. (2002) The Lost World of the Moa, Indiana University Press:Bloomington, 
http://www.stuff.co.nz/science/9396503/South-Island-duck-extinct

Further reading

External links

Brown Teal Site

brown teal
Endemic birds of New Zealand
brown teal
brown teal